Charles Vincent Crumb Jr. (March 13, 1942 – February 1992) was the older brother and original childhood mentor of American cartoonist Robert Crumb. He is best known for his on-screen role as a subject in the documentary film Crumb.

Life
Charles often appears as a character in his younger brother Robert Crumb's comics stories and autobiographical writings; Robert credits Charles's childhood obsession with making comics as the foundation of Robert's own devotion to his art. The two brothers drew comics together as children, often about "Animal Town"—one of the characters of which was Fuzzy the Bunny, who served as an alter ego for Charles, his creator. Robert later created several works adapted from things that he and Charles did as children, as well as telling stories about Charles in his comics. For instance, in 1970, Robert redrew an early Fuzzy the Bunny story written by Charles in 1952; it was published in Zap Comix #5.

As Charles entered adulthood, he began showing signs of mental illness. He later said that he had "homosexual pedophiliac tendencies".  According to his own testimony, Charles Crumb never succumbed to his urges, and remained determined not to. As a teenager, he had already developed a particular obsession for Bobby Driscoll, child star of the 1950 Disney film Treasure Island, and much of his artwork focused on themes and characters from the film and novel. Throughout the years, Charles remained constantly terrified that his sexual tendencies would be discovered by his mother, or by anyone.

During his adult life, Charles never left his family home, where he lived with his mother, and rarely ventured outside. In c. 1972, Charles was staying in a Philadelphia-area psychiatric hospital, where he was visited by Robert, who subsequently drew a story, "Fuzzy the Bunny in 'Nut Factory Blues,'" that was mostly made up of dialogue between the two brothers taken from Robert's visit.

In Charles's adult years, his artwork exhibited repetitive and painstaking concentric lines, filling in otherwise normal, Crumbesque drawings, reflecting an obsession with filling every last centimeter of white space. Charles Crumb and his artwork received wide public attention as a result of the success of the 1994 feature-length documentary film Crumb, in which Charles and some of his work are featured prominently. His artwork, including notebooks filled with tiny gestural marks that suggest handwriting, has been published and exhibited, sometimes in the context of outsider art.

In the film Crumb, R. Crumb describes how Charles would often react to things by saying "How perfectly goddamned delightful it all is, to be sure." It was a catch-phrase of his. Robert remarks, "Whenever he said that, it always took the wind out of my sails."

Charles Crumb committed suicide in February 1992, aged 49, reportedly by overdose.

Further reading
 Crumb Family Comics (Last Gasp, 1997)
 The Complete Crumb Comics (Fantagraphics, 1997–2005)
 Your Vigor for Life Appalls Me: Robert Crumb Letters 1958–1977 (Fantagraphics, 1998)

References

External links
 
 Lambiek Comiclopedia article.

American comics artists
American comics writers
Outsider artists
Artists who committed suicide
1942 births
1992 deaths
Artists from Philadelphia
American people of English descent
American people of Scottish descent
1992 suicides